Dennis Janke (born April 13, 1950 in Cleveland, Ohio) is an American comic book artist who was active in the industry from the mid-1980s to the mid-2000s, primarily as an inker. He is most well known for his work on the DC Comics character Superman, particularly his nine-year run as inker on Superman: The Man of Steel.

A freelancer, Janke worked for both DC and Marvel Comics during his career, penciling covers and stories here and there, but mostly focusing on "finish inking" over other artists' pencils. Janke has worked extensively with pencilers Jon Bogdanove and Jerry Ordway, and is a co-creator (with artist Ordway) of Bertron (who created Doomsday), and Mr. Z (best known from the Superman story "Time and Time Again"). With Mark Gruenwald and Paul Neary, Janke co-created Armadillo.

In his career, Janke has also worked on dozens of independent comic books and underground comix, including his own self-published series, Flaming Baloney (published with James R. Blevins c. 1975).

Biography

Education 
Janke earned his BFA from the  Cleveland Institute of Art.

Career 
Janke's first published work was a 1974 illustration in DC Comics' House of Mystery, but his professional career took off a decade later when he was hired to ink Paul Neary on Marvel's Captain America, which he did for two years.

Moving over to DC Comics in 1987, Janke inked the final nine issues of Electric Warrior over Jim Baikie's pencils. Next, he inked the four-issue mini-series The Phantom, pencilled by Joe Orlando and written by Peter David. Around the same time he became the regular inker on The Adventures of Superman and Superman, mostly inking Jerry Ordway's pencils. He then spent nine years as the inker of  Superman: The Man of Steel, mostly over Jon Bogdanove. (Bogdanove and Janke also illustrated many covers for the Steel solo title during this period.) As inker on Superman: The Man of Steel, Janke contributed to, and benefited from the success of, the best-selling 1992-1993 "The Death of Superman" story arc.

Janke's final major run as an inker was for The Spectre in 2002–2003 (over Norm Breyfogle's pencils). Since 2003, Janke's published comics credits have been rare.

Janke is currently at work on a graphic novel.

Personal life 
Janke is an amateur poet. He lives in Maine, in a house he was able to pay for with royalties from his work on "The Death of Superman."

Bibliography

As writer 
 (with James R. Blevins) (as Z. Capistance) "Stargazer," Witzend #12 (Wonderful Publishing Company, 1982) — also art
 (with Jerry Ordway) Adventures of Superman #484 (DC Comics, Nov. 1991) — also inks
 (with Roger Stern) Action Comics #671 (DC Comics, Nov. 1991) — also inks
(with Louise Simonson) Superman: The Man of Steel #6 (DC Comics, Dec. 1991) — also inks
 (with Louise Simonson) "Doomsday for the Fifth Dimension," Action Comics Annual #6 (DC Comics, 1994) — also pencils and Inks

As penciler 
 Adventures of Superman #496 (DC Comics, Nov. 1992) — also co-plot and inks
 "Gangbuster of Suicide Slum," The Legacy of Superman #1 (DC Comics, Mar. 1993)
 "Prologue: Communion," Doomsday Annual #1 (DC Comics, 1995) — also inks
 "Epilogue: Requiem," Doomsday Annual #1 (DC Comics, 1995) — also inks

As inker 
 Captain America (Marvel Comics, 1984-1986)
 Masters of the Universe #1–5 (Star Comics, 1986–1987)
 Electric Warrior #11–18 (DC Comics, 1987)
  The Phantom limited series (DC Comics, 1988)
 The Adventures of Superman (DC Comics, 1988–1989)
 Superman (DC Comics, 1989–1991, 1993)
 "Circle of Fear," Spelljammer #6 (DC Comics/TSR, Feb. 1991)
 Superman: The Man of Steel (DC Comics, 1991-1999)
 "Underworld Unleashed" limited series (DC Comics, Nov.–Dec. 1995)
 Superman's Nemesis: Lex Luthor limited series (DC Comics, Mar.–June 1999)
 Domination Factor: Avengers limited series (Marvel Comics, Nov. 1999–Feb. 2000)
  Batman: The Doom That Came to Gotham limited series (DC Comics, Nov. 2000–Jan. 2001)
 The Spectre (DC Comics, 2002-2003)
 Human Defense Corps issues #4-6 (DC Comics, Oct.–Dec. 2003)

Further reading 
 Thompson, Don & Maggie. Comic-Book Superstars: Who is Who Among Comics Creators (Iola, Wis.: Krause Publications, 1993), p. 102.

References

External links 
 
 Janke page at Inspiration for the Spirit

Comics inkers
American comics artists
1950 births
Living people
Cleveland Institute of Art alumni
Artists from Maine
Artists from Cleveland